Ibrahim Elkabbani (born 26 August 2002 in Giza) is an Egyptian professional squash player. , he was ranked number 417 in the world. As a professional, he won the 2020 Jaipur tournament.

References

2002 births
Living people
Egyptian male squash players
21st-century Egyptian people